A by-election was held for the Australian House of Representatives seat of Martin on 16 June 1928. This was triggered by the death of Nationalist MP and Trade and Customs Minister Herbert Pratten.

The by-election was won by the Nationalist candidate, Pratten's nephew Graham.

Results

References

1928 elections in Australia
New South Wales federal by-elections